Acanthozoon is a genus of polyclad flatworms belonging to the family Pseudocerotidae.

Description 
The genus Acanthozoon is physically characterized by a dorsal side with small raised papillae and ruffled edges.
Their body is elongate oval. The species of this genus have a complex and very folded pharynx. They also have small pseudo-tentacles that prick up like ears.
Because of their papillated upper surface, they are easily confused with species from the genus Thysanozoon, which are also endowed with dorsal papillae. However Acanthozoon possess only a single male copulative organ contrary to Thysanozoon.

Biology
This genus live in warm tropical marine waters. They are benthic and carnivorous.

Species list
The following species are recognised in the genus Acanthozoon: 
Acanthozoon albopapillosum Hyman, 1959
Acanthozoon albopunctatum Prudhoe, 1977
Acanthozoon alderi (Collingwood, 1876)
Acanthozoon allmani (Collingwood, 1876)
Acanthozoon armatum (Kelaart, 1858)
Acanthozoon auropunctatum (Kelaart, 1858)
Acanthozoon boehmigi (Stummer-Traunfels, 1895)
Acanthozoon fuscobulbosum (Dixit, Sivaperuman & Raghunathan, 2018
Acanthozoon hispidum (Du Bois-Reymond Marcus, 1955)
Acanthozoon indicum (Plehn, 1896)
Acanthozoon lepidum (Heath & McGregor, 1912)
Acanthozoon maculosum (Pearse, 1938)
Acanthozoon marginatum (Plehn, 1896)
Acanthozoon obscurum (Stummer-Traunfels, 1895)
Acanthozoon ovale (Schmarda, 1859)
Acanthozoon papilionis (Kelaart, 1858)
Acanthozoon plehni (Laidlaw, 1902)
Acanthozoon semperi (Stummer-Traunfels, 1895)

External links
 Discover Life, Acanthozoon
 UBIO

Bibliographical references
 Collingwood, 1876, On thirty-one species of marine Planarians, collected partly by the late Dr Kelaart F.L.S. at Trincomalee, and partly by D. Collingwood F.L.S. in the Eastern Seas., Linnean Society of London, Transactions II, Zoology,vol.1, p 83-98.

Rhabditophora genera
Rhabditophora